Chang Kai-chen and Lilia Osterloh were the defending champions, but Osterloh chose not to compete.

Chang played alongside Jill Craybas, but lost in the First Round to Chan Chin-wei and Han Xinyun.

Fourth seeds Kimiko Date-Krumm and Zhang Shuai won the title, defeating two-time Grand Slam champions Vania King and Yaroslava Shvedova in the final.

Seeds

Draw

Draw

References
 Main Draw

HP Open - Doubles
2011 HP Open